The 2013 season was the Seattle Seahawks' 38th in the National Football League (NFL) and their fourth under head coach Pete Carroll. With the Seahawks tenth win in the eleventh week of the season, the team secured double-digit victories in consecutive seasons for the first time in franchise history. Their 13–3 regular season record is tied with the 2005 season for the best in franchise history. Seattle’s defense in 2013 is regarded by many to be one of the best in NFL history.

Seattle entered the 2013 season at 17/2 odds to win Super Bowl XLVIII, just short of the Denver Broncos and San Francisco 49ers at 6/1. This was despite placing second in the NFC West and dropping its divisional round game against the Atlanta Falcons the previous year. The Seahawks were, by power ranking, ranked the strongest team by an NFL.com analyst before the season and by ESPN analysts after the regular season. The defense led the league in points allowed (231), yards allowed (4,378), and takeaways (39), the first team to lead all three categories since the 1985 Chicago Bears. Their +186 point differential is the best in franchise history.

The Seahawks clinched the NFC's No. 1 seed and homefield advantage throughout the playoffs with their 13–3 record. The Seahawks defeated the New Orleans Saints 23–15 in the Divisional round and the San Francisco 49ers 23–17 in the NFC Championship. In Super Bowl XLVIII, they defeated the Denver Broncos 43–8 for their first Super Bowl victory in franchise history. Of Seattle's thirteen wins, eight of them were decided by eleven points or more, with their season-best margin being a 45-17 win against the Jaguars. There were eight instances of the Seahawks allowing two touchdowns or less. The 2013 Seahawks' 14.4 points allowed per game in the regular season is the lowest in franchise history.

They ranked #18 on the 100 greatest teams of all time presented by the NFL on its 100th anniversary.

2013 draft class

Notes
 The Seahawks traded their first-round selection (No. 25 overall), one of their seventh-round selections (No. 214 overall; previously acquired in a trade that sent quarterback Tarvaris Jackson to the Buffalo Bills) and a conditional 2014 selection to the Minnesota Vikings in exchange for wide receiver Percy Harvin.
 The Seahawks traded their second-round selection (No. 56 overall) to the Baltimore Ravens in exchange for the Ravens' second-, fifth- and sixth- round selections — Nos. 62, 165 and 199 overall. The latter two selections were traded to the Detroit Lions in exchange for the Lions' fifth-round selection (No. 137 overall).
 The Seahawks acquired this fifth-round selection as part of a trade that sent linebacker Aaron Curry to the Oakland Raiders.
 The Seahawks acquired this seventh-round selection in a trade that sent linebacker Barrett Ruud to the New Orleans Saints.
 Compensatory selection.

Staff

Final roster

     Starters in bold.
 (*) Denotes players that were selected for the 2014 Pro Bowl.

Schedule

Preseason

Regular season

Bold indicates division opponents.

Postseason

Standings

Division

Conference

Game summaries

Preseason

Week P1: at San Diego Chargers

Week P2: vs. Denver Broncos

Week P3: at Green Bay Packers

Week P4: vs. Oakland Raiders

Regular season

Week 1: at Carolina Panthers

The Seattle Seahawks kicked off their 2013 campaign with a hard-fought, ugly win over the Carolina Panthers, 12–7. This game marked Russell Wilson's first 300-yard passing game, and Cam Newton's worst career performance, posting 125 yards through the air, a career low.

The first quarter was scoreless, with both sides exchanging a couple of punts. On their third possession of the game, in the second quarter, Seattle drove into the red zone, capping it with a Stephen Hauschka 27-yard field goal. Carolina responded immediately, taking advantage of a couple of Seattle penalties and some big runs by DeAngelo Williams. Cam Newton hit Steve Smith for a 3-yard TD. Seattle responded with a drive to around the Carolina 27 yard line, but Charles Godfrey sacked Russell Wilson and stripped the football, which Carolina recovered. So the first half ended 7–3, in favor of Carolina.

The second half began with a defensive battle. Hauschka made a 40-yard field goal, after a drive that lasted over 4 minutes, cutting the lead to 7–6. After forcing Carolina to punt midway through the fourth quarter, Seattle's offense produced its finest drive of the day. A couple of Russell Wilson passes, followed by a Robert Turbin 15-yard scamper, set up Seattle at the Panthers' 43 yard line. Russell Wilson overthrew receiver Stephen Williams on first down, but on second down and 10, using exactly the same play, Wilson connected with second-year man Jermaine Kearse for a 43-yard score, with 10 minutes left to play. They failed on the two-point conversion however, so Seattle clung to a 12–7 lead. DeAngelo Williams made some big runs. Inside the Seattle 35 yard line, Williams took off for 24 yards and looked like he was going to score, but Earl Thomas caused him to fumble inside the 10 yard line.

Week 2: vs. San Francisco 49ers

In week 2, the Seahawks took on their division rivals, the San Francisco 49ers. Prior to the season, NFL analysts rated this rivalry as the top upcoming rivalry, as well as the top rivalry of the decade. Both teams proved that point, when they had an arms race in the off-season, Seattle picking up Percy Harvin and San Francisco picking Anquan Boldin in the off-season, among others. Last season, the teams were 1–1 against each other, Seattle being the better team, as they blew out the Niners 42–13 in the last meeting in Seattle, coincidentally, also on Sunday Night Football. It was also a day that Russell Wilson and Colin Kaepernick appeared to bet an eyebrow, with the loser shaving his eyebrow; this was later revealed to be a publicity stunt. Finally, it was a day where former Seahawk Shaun Alexander would raise the 12th man flag.

The game began quietly though, as both sides failed to establish a rhythm. The game was delayed midway through the first quarter due to lightning in the vicinity of the stadium, the second such case in the 2013 season (Ravens-Broncos kickoff game in week 1 was the first). After getting back onto the field, the 49ers blocked a Seahawks punt and got the ball in Seattle territory. However, Seattle claimed a whistle was heard from the crowd, which confused the linemen and the punter. That claim was later justified by NBC analyst Cris Collinsworth. The Niners took advantage and drove to the Seattle 10-yard line. However, on third down, Earl Thomas intercepted a Colin Kaepernick pass, and Seattle regained possession. A few plays later, Russell Wilson was intercepted by rookie Eric Reid, and the tug of war continued into the second quarter.

All was quiet until midway through the second quarter, where fullback Bruce Miller was caught holding in the endzone, the result of which was a safety, and a Seattle 2–0 lead. Later on, defensive end Cliff Avril strip sacked Kaepernick and K. J. Wright recovered for Seattle, the result of which was a Stephen Hauschka 30-yard field goal. Halftime came with a small 5–0 Seahawks lead. The game was pretty dark and messy at that point, the only bright side being Seattle running back Marshawn Lynch.

In the third quarter, the Seahawks came out roaring. On third and 12, Wilson connected with receiver Doug Baldwin for a 51-yard gain to inside the 49ers 25 yard line. A few plays later, Lynch took it to the house on a 14-yard run, 12–0 Seattle. The 49ers responded with a drive to the Seattle 6-yard line, capped of by Phil Dawson 21-yard field goal, that included a 28-yard scramble by Kaepernick, 12–3 Seahawks. However, that would be it for the Niners, and the third quarter.

In the fourth quarter, the Seahawks demolished the Niners on all phases of play. It started with Wilson hitting Lynch for a 7-yard score on third down. A few plays into the Niners next drive, Kaepernick was intercepted by Richard Sherman, who took it to the 49ers 25-yard line. That resulted in a 37-yard Hauschka field goal. On the ensuing Niners drive, Kaepernick was intercepted again, this time by safety Kam Chancellor, who had signed a contract extension earlier in the year. Lynch scored on a 2-yard run on the next play. Seattle led 29–3. The 49ers fumbled the ensuing kickoff, and Seattle recovered.

Seattle won, in convincing style, silencing any critics. The 12th man also broke a Guinness world record, for the loudest outdoor stadium. Yet again, Seattle dominated on SNF, and Pete Carroll improved to 3–4 overall against the Niners, and 2–3 against bitter rival Jim Harbaugh. Seattle was now 2–0, and still unbeaten at home.

Week 3: vs. Jacksonville Jaguars

The Seahawks entered week 3 on top of the NFC to take on the Jacksonville Jaguars who were on the opposite end of the AFC. This game did not garner much attention, considering the fact that it was a "best vs worst" game. However, that didn't change Seattle's positive "1–0" mentality to the game.

Seattle opened up the game with a punt. After forcing a Jacksonville three and out, on a drive which included a Clinton McDonald sack, Russell Wilson marched the Seahawks right down the field, on a drive that included a 27-yard run by Marshawn Lynch, and on third and goal from the 1-yard line, hit tight end Zach Miller for a touchdown, and an early 7–0 lead.

Picking up from where they left off in the first quarter, Seattle took their first drive of the second quarter, where Wilson connected with Miller for a 4-yard touchdown pass, the duo's second of the day. After a Stephen Hauschka 21-yard field goal on the next drive, the game got quiet until the Jaguars final drive of the half, where Chad Henne was intercepted by linebacker Bobby Wagner, with under a minute left to play. Wilson then made some beautiful completions to receivers Golden Tate and Sidney Rice in lightning fast succession, the latter of whom caught an 11-yard pass for a touchdown with 10 seconds left on the clock, to send Seattle up 24–0 at the half.

On the Seahawks first drive of the second half, they picked up were they left off, as Wilson hit rice for a 23-yard score, marking Wilson's fourth TD pass of the day, tying a career-high, and putting the Hawks up 31–0. On the ensuing drive, however, Wilson was picked off by linebacker Paul Posluszny, who returned it to the Seattle 2-yard line, where Jaguars RB Maurice Jones-Drew punched it in on the next play, 31–7 Seattle. That was the last time Wilson touched the ball. Backup Tarvaris Jackson took over and drove Seattle to the Jaguars 35-yard line, not missing a single completion on the drive. He then threw a TD pass to Doug Baldwin, adding to the lead, 38–7 Seattle.

Seattle then shut its system off, which allowed Henne to hit receiver Cecil Shorts III for a couple of long completions on the Jaguars next couple of drives, racking up 10 points, including a fourth-quarter run by Jordan Todman, his first career TD, 38–17 Seattle. Jackson led the Seahawks downfield, scoring on a 5-yard scramble, re-establishing a big lead, 45–17.

Seattle started 3–0 for the first time since 2006, and the first time in the Pete Carroll era. Seattle is still unbeaten at home, with a 10–0 record including last year.

Week 4: at Houston Texans

The Seahawks led 3-0 after the first quarter, but the Texans scored 20 unanswered points in the second quarter, building a 20-3 halftime lead. However, the Seahawks outscored the Texans 17-0 in the third and fourth quarters. With less than three minutes to go, and the Texans leading 20-13, Matt Schaub's pass on 3rd down was picked off by Richard Sherman and returned 58 yards for a pick six, allowing the Seahawks to tie the game and force overtime. The Seahawks would go on to win the game in overtime by a final score of 23-20. With the win, the Seahawks would open the season with a 4-0 record for the first time in franchise history.

Week 5: at Indianapolis Colts

This would be the first meeting between quarterbacks Russell Wilson and Andrew Luck, who were both selected in the 2012 NFL Draft. Though Wilson and the Seahawks maintained a lead throughout the first three quarters, Luck led the Colts back, taking the lead and never letting go in the 4th. It would be the first loss for the Seahawks in the season, dropping their record to 4-1. The Colts punted and the Seahawks drove down the field and scored a field goal to go up 3-0. After another Indy three-and-out, Russell Wilson threw a 10-yard touchdown pass to Golden Tate to take a 10-0 lead. Then another Indy punt was blocked and bounced out of the endzone to extend the lead to 12-0. Seattle punted to Indy when Andrew Luck threw a 73-yard touchdown to T.Y. Hilton to make the score 12-7. Seattle drove into field goal range but a 48-yard field goal was blocked and returned for a touchdown by the Colts. Indy led 14-12 until Wilson found Jermaine Kearse to give Seattle a 19-14 lead. Luck led the Colts downfield and they kicked a field goal to make it 19-17 at the half. Seattle kicked another field goal to make it 22-17. Indianapolis fumbled and led to a 25-17 Seahawks lead. Luck then found Hilton in the endzone but the two-point-conversion failed leaving  the score at 25-23. Seattle then kicked a 4th field goal to extend their lead to 28-23. Indy scored a touchdown to make it 31-28 and then a field goal to make it 34-28 final.

Week 6: vs. Tennessee Titans

Following their loss to the Colts, the Seahawks returned to CenturyLink field to host the Tennessee Titans. The Seahawks allowed a field goal from Titans kicker Rob Bironas, but a second quarter touchdown from running back Marshawn Lynch caused the Seahawks to retake the lead. The Seahawks attempted to extend their lead at the end of the quarter with a field goal. With usual holder Jon Ryan in the locker room with a potential injury, reserve safety Chris Maragos was asked to hold the ball for the field goal attempt. Maragos however fumbled the snap, which was recovered by Titans special teamer Jason McCourty and run back 77 yards for a touchdown. The Seahawks then entered halftime behind 7-10.

During the 3rd quarter, the Seahawks held the Titans scoreless while scoring a field goal of their own, tying the game. An additional field goal during the 4th put the Seahawks ahead again. On the first play of the next drive, Fitzpatrick threw an interception to Seahawks cornerback Richard Sherman. The Seahawks capitalized by with another touchdown from Lynch. The Seahawks would only allow another field goal from the Titans, and the win brought their record to 5-1.

Week 7: at Arizona Cardinals

Playing on Thursday Night Football, the Seahawks easily defeated their division rival behind quarterback Russell Wilson's 235 passing yards, running back Marshawn Lynch's 91 running yards, and two interceptions from secondary members Brandon Browner and Earl Thomas.

Week 8: at St. Louis Rams

The Seahawks defeated the Rams 14-9 in a Monday Night Football thriller. The Rams were successful at limiting the Seahawks offense, holding running back Marshawn Lynch to a season low of only 23 yards and sacking quarterback Russell Wilson seven times. After holding the Rams to a field goal in the first quarter, the Seahawks went ahead with a 2-yard touchdown pass to Golden Tate.

The Rams responded in the third quarter with another field goal, cutting down the Seahawks' lead to 1. After an incomplete pass to Jermaine Kearse on the first play of the next drive, Wilson threw an 80-yard touchdown to Golden Tate. It was the longest play of either player's career. On his way towards the end zone, Tate turned and sarcastically waved towards Rams safety Rodney McLeod. Though the touchdown would count, the Seahawks would be penalized for taunting during the kickoff. Carroll chastised Tate after the penalty occurred, and Tate was fined $7,875 after the game.

After the Seahawks allowed an additional Rams field goal, the game came down to the final drive. The Rams, in possession of the ball with 5:42 left in the game, managed to drive the ball all the way to the 6 yard line with less than 1:20 left on the clock. A missed throw from Rams quarterback Kellen Clemens and a 4-yard run from Rams running back Daryl Richardson allowed the Rams a 3rd and Goal at the 2-yard line, but a defensive offsides call on Seahawks defensive end Chris Clemons cut the distance in half. The Seahawks stopped an additional run from Richardson, and Rams head coach Jeff Fisher called a timeout with only 4 seconds left in the game. Seahawks cornerback Brandon Browner successfully defended Clemens's final pass towards Brian Quick, sealing the Seahawks victory and bringing their record to 7-1.

Week 9: vs. Tampa Bay Buccaneers

The top-ranked Seahawks hosted the winless Tampa Bay Buccaneers in what many believed would be a blowout. However, the Buccaneers marched to a 21-0 lead during the 2nd quarter, which included a trick play from running back Mike James. Despite giving up a field goal later in the game, the Seahawks came roaring back, tying the game during the fourth quarter and forcing overtime. The Seahawks narrowly avoided a loss with a 27-yard field goal from Stephen Hauschka.

Week 10: at Atlanta Falcons

This was a rematch of the NFC Divisional matchup from the 2012 postseason. The Seahawks jumped out to a 23-3 halftime lead and never looked back, routing the Falcons 33-10. The Seahawks won their fifth consecutive game as their record improved to 9-1.

Week 11: vs. Minnesota Vikings

At the beginning of this game, Doug Baldwin flew the Philippines flag in memory of the victims of Typhoon Yolanda. Free agent signee Percy Harvin saw his first minutes of playing time of the season during the game, incidentally against the team that drafted him. He would catch one pass for 17 yards and return one kickoff for 58 yards. The Seahawks entered the bye week with a 10-1 record, the best in the NFL at the time.

Week 13: vs. New Orleans Saints

The Seahawks dominated from start to finish, routing the Saints 34-7. The Seahawks won their 7th consecutive game as their record improved to 11-1. They became the first team to clinch a berth for the 2013 postseason.

Week 14: at San Francisco 49ers

In week 14 the Seahawks traveled out of their stadium to San Francisco where they took a loss to the 49ers. Russell Wilson was intercepted to end the game and continued the Seahawks' losing streak in Candlestick Park in which they last won in 2008. It was their last appearance at Candlestick, as the 49ers moved to Levi's Stadium for the 2014 season.

With the loss, the Seahawks' record dropped into 11-2. This would be the last time they lost to the 49ers until 2018.

Week 15: at New York Giants

In what many pundits dubbed a "Super Bowl dress rehearsal", the Seahawks faced the New York Giants at MetLife Stadium, where the Super Bowl would be held at the end of the season. The Legion of Boom intercepted Giants quarterback Eli Manning five times and held the team scoreless throughout the entire game.

Week 16: vs. Arizona Cardinals

In Seattle's first loss at home since the 2011 season, the team record dropped to 12-3. Amazingly, this would also be Russell Wilson's first home loss in football since his college season with North Carolina State University.

Week 17: vs. St. Louis Rams

With the win, the Seahawks' record improved to 13-3 as they clinched the NFC West and the NFC's #1 seed. The Seahawks would hold homefield advantage for the entirety of the 2013 postseason.

Postseason

Seattle entered the postseason as the #1 seed in the NFC.

NFC Divisional Playoff: vs. #6 New Orleans Saints

NFC Championship Game: vs. #5 San Francisco 49ers

This was the Seahawks' first conference Championship game appearance since 2005 and only the third ever for the franchise, after 2005 and 1983. The Seahawks overcame a 10-3 deficit at the end of the half and finished strong, outscoring San Francisco 20-7 in the 2nd half. With Seattle leading 20-17 in the 4th quarter, Colin Kaepernick tried to rally his team, but fumbled once and threw 2 interceptions in the final three drives in the game for San Francisco. In the fourth quarter, NaVorro Bowman suffered a major knee injury on a tackle and forced fumble near the goal line, but the 49ers forced another fumble on the next play on 4th down. On the second play following fumble recovery, Kaepernick threw an interception to Kam Chancellor. Kaepernick again had the 49ers in position to try for a win, but his pass to Michael Crabtree in the end zone was deflected by Richard Sherman and intercepted by Malcolm Smith, locking up the win for Seattle.

Super Bowl XLVIII: vs. #A1 Denver Broncos

In dominating fashion, the Seahawks would win their first championship in the history of the franchise. This was also the first football team since the 1990 Buffalo Bills to not have any players on the roster with Super Bowl experience. It was Seattle's first major championship in 35 years since the 1979 Seattle SuperSonics. Linebacker Malcolm Smith would end up earning the Super Bowl MVP award for his 69-yard interception, 1 fumble recovery, and 6 tackles.

References

External links
 
 2013 Seattle Seahawks season at ESPN
 2013 Seattle Seahawks season at Pro Football Reference

Seattle
Seattle Seahawks seasons
NFC West championship seasons
National Football Conference championship seasons
Super Bowl champion seasons
Seattle Seahawks